Jennifer James "Jeni" Arndt is an American politician serving as the mayor of Fort Collins, Colorado. She assumed office on April 27, 2021.

Early life and education 
A native of Fort Collins, Colorado, Arndt graduated from Poudre High School. She earned a Bachelor of Arts degree in sociology from Colorado College, a Master of Arts in geography from the University of Colorado Boulder, a Master of Science in special education from Purdue University, a Master of Business Administration from the University of Colorado Boulder, and a PhD in curriculum and instruction from Purdue University.

Career 
Arndt is a former member of the Colorado House of Representatives from the 53rd District, serving from January 7, 2015, until her resignation on April 16, 2021. She is a member of the Democratic Party.

On December 30, 2020, Arndt announced that she was running for mayor of Fort Collins, Colorado in the April 6, 2021 election. Arndt won the race, defeating two opponents and winning about 63% of the total votes cast. She assumed office on April 27, 2021.

References

External links
Legislative website
Mayoral campaign website

Democratic Party members of the Colorado House of Representatives
21st-century American politicians
Living people
Year of birth missing (living people)
21st-century American women politicians
Women state legislators in Colorado
Politicians from Fort Collins, Colorado